Dece Fu Njogu was a king of Cayor in the 16th century. In 1549, he gained his country's independence from the country Jolof and later rapidly took over it. He is known for his military invasions of Kaabu and Fouta Tooro. He died in 1599, in Ndakaru, nowadays known as Dakar.

History of Senegal
Year of birth missing
Year of death missing